Kwame Cavil is a former gridiron football wide receiver.

College career
Cavil played college football at the University of Texas at Austin from 1997 to 1999. In 1999, he set a school single-season record by recording 100 receptions. He was the first player ever to leave one of Mack Brown's Texas teams with college eligibility remaining. Cavil was suspended from the team prior to the bowl game in his junior year, for "violation of team rules." The nature of the violation was not specified by Brown, Cavil, or the university. It is uncertain if Cavil would have been welcomed back to the team for his senior season if he had not left early, but it was reported at the time that Brown says he never tells players what to do if they are considering entering the NFL draft early, implying that it was in fact an early departure for the draft. Cavil himself said "After great deliberation with my family, I have decided to forgo my final year of eligibility and go to the NFL," Cavil subsequently went undrafted.

After his professional football career, Cavil returned to the University of Texas to complete his studies, earning his bachelor's degree from the College of Education in the Spring of 2010.

Professional career
Cavil was a wide receiver for the NFL Buffalo Bills in 2000.

Cavil joined the CFL in 2002, signing his first contract with the Montreal Alouettes. He has since moved around the league, most recently having been traded by the Hamilton Tiger-Cats to the Blue Bombers on Friday, August 18, 2006 for a third round pick in the 2007 CFL Draft.

References
 Cavil moves on Edmonton Sun August 19, 2006
  Mack Brown-Texas Football May 25, 2010
  Texas' Cavil puts name into NFL hat Sports Illustrated January 7, 2000

1979 births
Living people
African-American players of American football
African-American players of Canadian football
American football wide receivers
Buffalo Bills players
Canadian football wide receivers
Edmonton Elks players
Hamilton Tiger-Cats players
People from Waco, Texas
Texas Longhorns football players
21st-century African-American sportspeople
20th-century African-American sportspeople